The 2014 women's road cycling season was the twelfth for the Specialized–lululemon cycling team, which began as the T-Mobile team in 2003. After being part of the team since 2005, Ina-Yoko Teutenberg left the team for her retirement. Also Ellen van Dijk, the top ranked UCI and best rider of the 2013 season left the team, together with Gillian Carleton and Katie Colclough. Chantal Blaak, Karol-Ann Canuel, Élise Delzenne and Tiffany Cromwell joined the team with the last becoming the leader of the team.

Roster

Four riders joined and four riders left the team. After being part of the team since 2005, sprinter Ina-Yoko Teutenberg left the team for retirement after a crash in March 2013. The second important rider who left is Ellen van Dijk who was top ranked in the 2013 UCI World Ranking and 2013 UCI World Cup and was important for the many team time trial victories. Van Dijk signed a contract for three years with the Dutch Boels–Dolmans Cycling Team. Katie Colclough announced her retirement at the age of only 23 and Gillian Carleton left the team after to recover from a depression.

The new riders were the French Élise Delzenne, the Dutch Chantal Blaak, the Canadian Karol-Ann Canuel and the Australian Tiffany Cromwell. Cromwell won the Omloop het Nieuwsblad in 2013 and became the leader of the team.

As of 1 January 2014. Ages as of 1 January 2014.

Riders who joined the team for the 2014 season

Riders who left the team during or after the 2013 season

References

Specialized-lululemon
Specialized-lululemon season
Velocio–SRAM Pro Cycling